Praviršulio tyrelis, also known as the Pravirsulio Tyrelis State Nature Reserve, is a nature reserve outside Šiauliai in Lithuania with many rare examples of flora and fauna.  It officially became a botanical and zoological reserve in 1969 and has since become protected by the EU Habitats Directive and Birds Directive.  At 3327 hectares the area is mostly a forest though around 13% of the land is a bog.  The reserve is home to at least 100 different bird species, 14 of which appear in Lithuania's Red Book.

Protection status
The reserve was given the protection status of IUCN Category IV in 1986, meaning that it is a "Habitat/Species Management Area".

References

Nature reserves in Lithuania
IUCN Category IV
Tourist attractions in Šiauliai County